The Chief Range is a mountain range in Lincoln County, Nevada.

The Chief Range lies northwest of Meadow Valley about 10 miles southwest of  Panaca and Cathedral Gorge State Park and about 8 miles north-northwest of Caliente and the Kershaw-Ryan State Park.

The Highland Range lies to the north, the Burnt Springs Range is to the west and the Delamar Mountains are to the south.

References 

Mountain ranges of Nevada
Mountain ranges of the Great Basin
Mountain ranges of Lincoln County, Nevada